Drymos (Δρυμός) may refer to several places in Greece:

Drymos, Achaea, a village in the municipal unit Kleitoria, Achaea
Drymos, Aetolia-Acarnania, a village in the municipal unit Anaktorio, Aetolia-Acarnania
Drymos, Laconia, a village in the municipality East Mani, Laconia
Drymos, Larissa, a village in the municipality Elassona, Larissa regional unit
Drymos, Thessaloniki, a village in the municipal unit Mygdonia, Thessaloniki regional unit
Drymos (Acarnania), a town of ancient Acarnania
Drymos (Attica), a fortress of ancient Attica
Drymos (Phocis), a town of ancient Phocis